Goodbye to the Island is the fourth studio album by Welsh singer Bonnie Tyler. It became her final work with RCA Records after it was released in January 1981. Ronnie Scott and Steve Wolfe wrote the majority of songs for the album, and co-produced the record with Hugh Murphy.

Music critics described the album as "more upbeat" than her previous album Diamond Cut (1979). Goodbye to the Island had the weakest sales of all albums Tyler released through RCA, only charting in Norway at number 38.

Release and promotion 
Goodbye to the Island became Tyler’s final album under RCA Records. It was released in January 1981 on vinyl and cassette. In 1991, Castle Communications issued the album on CD with an alternate artwork. The album was again reissued in 2010 by 7T’s with two bonus tracks. Goodbye to the Island featured on the 2019 box set The RCA Years released by Cherry Pop with eight bonus tracks. This version of the album was released digitally in the United States and Canada in 2020.

Singles 
The album's lead single, "I Believe in Your Sweet Love" was released in November 1979. It reached number 138 on the US Record World chart in the following month, and 27 on the Canadian RPM Adult Contemporary chart in February 1980. 

Almost a year later, "I'm Just a Woman" was released as the album's second single but it failed to chart.

Tyler won the Grand Prix International prize at the World Popular Song Festival for her performance of "Sitting on the Edge of the Ocean", which became the album's third single in November 1979.

"Goodbye to the Island" was released shortly before the album as its fourth and final single in January 1981, and it reached no. 54 on the UK Airplay Chart.

Track listing 
All tracks produced by Hugh Murphy, Ronnie Scott and Steve Wolfe, except "I'm Just a Woman" and "We Danced on the Ceiling" produced by Hugh Murphy.

Personnel
Bonnie Tyler - vocals
Garth Watt-Roy, Gary Taylor, Robert Ahwai, Steve Lipson - guitar
Felix Krish, Kevin Dunne - bass
Betsy Cook, Mike McNaught - keyboards
Jeff Allen, Liam Genockey - drums
Raphael Ravenscroft - saxophone
Betsy Cook, John Cameron, Mike McNaught, Wil Malone - arrangements
Technical
Douglas Hopkins, Gregg Jackman, Steve Lipson - engineer
Andrew Christian - art direction 
Chris Thomson - cover photography

Charts

Release history

References

1981 albums
Bonnie Tyler albums
CBS Records albums